William Granger, from Dover, Kent (by 1491 – 1544/1545), was an English politician.

He was a Member of Parliament (MP) for Dover in 1542.

References

15th-century births
1545 deaths
Members of the Parliament of England for Dover
English MPs 1542–1544